Ayr Mount is a Federal style plantation house located east of Hillsborough, in Orange County, North Carolina, the United States of America.

Circa 1815, he had a home built for himself, his wife, Margaret, and their children, a brick dwelling with a two-story, three-bay main block flanked by one-story, two-bay wings. A full-width front porch, added about 1894, was removed sometime after 1971 and replaced with a facsimile of the original porch.

Mrs. Samuel (Emily) Kirkland, the last of four generations of Kirklands to occupy the house, lived there until 1985.

The property had gone through several owners prior to Kirkland's purchase of the property, the most well-known being William Few, Jr., whose father, William Few, Sr., had a house built on the property c. 1764.

It is owned and operated by Classical American Homes Preservation Trust. The home has been furnished with Federal period antiques and decorative art, including some original Kirkland furnishings. Ayr Mount features guided house tours and the one-mile (1.6 km) hiking trail the "Poet's Walk."

References

External links

-  Ayr Mount website
- Classical American Homes Preservation Trust

Federal architecture in North Carolina
Historic American Buildings Survey in North Carolina
Houses on the National Register of Historic Places in North Carolina
Houses in Orange County, North Carolina
Hillsborough, North Carolina
Historic house museums in North Carolina
Plantation houses in North Carolina
Museums in Orange County, North Carolina
Houses completed in 1815
National Register of Historic Places in Orange County, North Carolina
Richard Jenrette